Karl Oskar Freiberg (pen name, Oskar Kurmiste; 2 May 1894 Mäksa Parish (now Kastre Parish), Kreis Dorpat – 2 December 1941 Sverdlovsk, Russia) was an Estonian journalist, theatre critic, playwright, translator and politician. He was a member of the I, III, IV, and V Riigikogu.

Freiberg graduated from the University of Tartu in 1914. From 1916 he worked as a journalist on the editorial boards of several publications (Vaba Sõna, Töö Lipp, Võitlus, Tööliste Leht, Rahva Sõna). From 1934 until 1940 he worked as playwright at the Tallinn Workers' Theatre, and from 1940 until 1941, as a translator at the Estonian State Publishing House. Freiberg translated a number of scientific works and fiction from German, Danish and Norwegian. He has also translated several of Hella Wuolijoki's plays from Finnish.

In June 1941, he was arrested by the NKVD during the Soviet occupation of Estonia and imprisoned in Sverdlovsk Oblast where he was executed on 2 December 1941.

References

1894 births
1941 deaths
People from Kastre Parish
People from Kreis Dorpat
Estonian Socialist Revolutionary Party politicians
Estonian Independent Socialist Workers' Party politicians
Estonian Socialist Workers' Party politicians
Members of the Estonian Constituent Assembly
Members of the Riigikogu, 1920–1923
Members of the Riigikogu, 1926–1929
Members of the Riigikogu, 1929–1932
Members of the Riigikogu, 1932–1934
Estonian journalists
Estonian critics
Estonian theatre directors
Estonian dramatists and playwrights
Estonian translators
Estonian male writers
20th-century Estonian writers
University of Tartu alumni
Estonian people executed by the Soviet Union